Charles Phillip Thompson (March 21, 1918 – June 16, 2016) was an American swing and bebop pianist, organist, composer, and arranger.

Early life
Thompson was born in Springfield, Ohio, United States, on March 21, 1918. His father was a minister and his stepmother played the piano. "He first studied violin and briefly played tenor saxophone, but took up piano as a teenager." He moved with his family to Parsons, Kansas, in the southeastern part of the state. Later Thompson attended a Kansas City high school.

By the age of twelve, Thompson was playing private parties with Bennie Moten and his band in Colorado Springs, Colorado. During this time, Count Basie played off and on with Moten's band. During a show, Basie called Thompson up to perform. He was dubbed "Sir Charles Thompson" by Lester Young.

Career
Thompson chiefly worked with small groups, including the Coleman Hawkins/Howard McGhee sextet in 1944–1945. Throughout the 1940s he played and recorded with Charlie Parker, Dexter Gordon, Miles Davis and J. C. Heard, among others. He played with Lucky Millinder's big band in 1946, and under Illinois Jacquet in 1947–48 and 1952.

He worked freelance, principally on organ, for much of the 1950s. He played with Parker again in 1953 and recorded with Vic Dickenson and Buck Clayton in 1953–54. Thompson worked with Earl Bostic in the late 1950s before heading his own quartet in 1959.

In the early 1960s, he toured Europe and Canada with Buck Clayton. Thompson was in Europe again in 1964, with Jazz at the Philharmonic, and in 1967 for the show Jazz from a Swinging Era. "Living variously on the West Coast, where he often worked with Vernon Alley, and in Toronto, Paris, and Zurich, he continued to lead small groups through the 1970s and 1980s." He composed the jazz standard "Robbins' Nest".

Personal life 
Thompson had one daughter. He died on June 16, 2016 at the age of 98 in a hospital near Tokyo, Japan. He had lived in the country with his wife Makiko since 2002.

Discography

As leader
 Takin' Off (Delmark)
 Sir Charles Thompson and Coleman Hawkins: For the Ears (Vanguard, 1954–56)
 Sir Charles Thompson and the Swing Organ (Columbia, 1959)
 Sir Charles: Rockin' Rhythm with Sir Charles at the Organ (Columbia, 1961)
 Hey There (Black & Blue, 1974)
 Robbins' Nest: Live at the Jazz Showcase (Delmark, 2000)
 I Got Rhythm: Live at the Jazz Showcase (Delmark, 2001)

As sideman
With Buck Clayton
The Huckle-Buck and Robbins' Nest (Columbia, 1954)
How Hi the Fi (Columbia, 1954)
All the Cats Join In (Columbia 1956)
Buck & Buddy (Swingville, 1960) with Buddy Tate
One for Buck (Columbia, 1961)
Buck & Buddy Blow the Blues (Swingville, 1961) with Buddy Tate
With Dexter Gordon
Landslide (Blue Note, 1961-62 [1980])
With Dodo Greene
My Hour of Need (Blue Note, 1962)
With Joe Newman
 The Count's Men (Jazztone, 1955)
 I Feel Like a Newman (Storyville, 1956)
With Paul Quinichette
 Moods (EmArcy, 1954)
With Harold Ashby and Paul Gonsalves
 Tenor Stuff (Columbia (UK),1961)
With Ike Quebec
 The Complete Blue Note 45 Sessions (Blue Note, 1960–2)
With Joe Williams
 Together (Roulette, 1961) with Harry "Sweets" Edison
 [[Jazz Spectacular (Frankie Laine) (Columbia 1955)

Bibliography
 Cook, Richard and Morton, Brian (2008) The Penguin Guide to Jazz Recordings (9th ed.), Penguin, p. 1400. .

References

1918 births
2016 deaths
American jazz pianists
American male pianists
Apollo Records artists
Bebop pianists
Columbia Records artists
Delmark Records artists
Musicians from Springfield, Ohio
Swing pianists
Jazz musicians from Ohio
American male jazz musicians
Vanguard Records artists
Black & Blue Records artists
Sackville Records artists